François-Rupert Carabin (17 March 1862, in Saverne, Bas-Rhin – 28 November 1932, in Strasbourg) was a French cabinetmaker, photographer and sculptor. His work was representative of the Art Nouveau style.

Biography
Carabin was born of Alsacian parents on 17 March 1862. His family had been displaced by war in 1870 and after refusing to accept German nationality they moved to Paris when Carabin was just 8 years old. At the age of 16 he apprenticed with an engraver there. His first job was as an ornamental sculptor for a furniture manufacturer in a Saint-Antoine suburb.

Between 1889 and 1919, Carabin sculpted many furniture pieces, mainly constructed from oak, pear, or walnut wood. One such piece, completed in 1893, was entitled Fauteuil.

He made medals and practiced photography. After World War I concluded, he was named the director of the École supérieure des Arts Décoratifs de Strasbourg and was regularly invited to the Vienna Secession. He worked in the artistic milieu of Montmartre and made a series of photographic studies of prostitutes. His sculptures and designs featured the female form as structural rather than symbolic elements, tending towards the Decadent style. He sculpted a series of statuettes of dancers in bronze which he exhibited in 1897 at the Bernheim Gallery.  He also participated at the Salon des Indépendants from 1884 to 1891.

Carabin completed many monuments to the dead in the Great War, including the monument in Saverne that was destroyed in 1942 during World War II.
Carabin died on 28 November 1932 in Strasbourg, France.

Selected works

Main works
 La légende Savernoise, 1914, statuette, wood, Musée d'Orsay, Paris.
 Loïe Fuller, 1896–1897, statuette, bronze, Nouvelle Pinacothèque de Munich
 la Critique artistique, 1891, statuette, polychrome wax, Musée d'Orsay
 Fontaine-Lavabo, 1893, Musée d'Orsay
 Fauteuil, 1893, oak and wrought iron, Musée d'Art Moderne de Strasbourg
 La Volupté (or La Luxure, or La Jeunesse), 1902, Musée d'Art Moderne de Strasbourg
 La Souffrance (or La Vieillesse, or L'Envie), 1902, Musée d'Art Moderne de Strasbourg
 Bibliothèque, 1890, wrought iron, Musée d'Orsay à Paris
 Buffet Sel et poivre, 1906–1908
 Encrier, 1900–1901, Richmond, Virginia Museum of Fine Arts

References
 Gordon Campbell, The Grove encyclopedia of decorative arts, Volume 1, Oxford University Press, 2006, p. 175
 John Hannavy, Encyclopedia of nineteenth-century photography, Volume 1, CRC Press, 2008, p. 270
 Ank Trumpie, Garth Clark, Keramiekmuseum het Princessehof, Deliciously decadent: tableware of the 20th and 21st centuries, 010 Publishers, 2004,

Inline Citations

External links
    
 

1862 births
1932 deaths
Art Nouveau designers
Art Nouveau sculptors
Art Nouveau medallists
French medallists
French furniture designers
People from Saverne
French photographers
20th-century French sculptors
19th-century French sculptors
French male sculptors
French cabinetmakers
19th-century French male artists